The Cayman Islands Monetary Authority (CIMA) is the primary financial services regulator of the Cayman Islands and supervises its currency board.

The CIMA manages the Cayman Islands currency, regulates and supervises financial services, provides assistance to overseas regulatory authorities and advises the Cayman Islands government on financial-services regulatory matters.

It is a corporation created pursuant to the Cayman Islands Monetary Authority Law (2013 Revision).

Regulatory Framework
 Banks and Lenders
 Offshore Banks
 Funds and Segregated Portfolio Companies
 Payment Processing Services 
 Credit Unions

See also
 Cayman Islands dollar
 Economy of the Cayman Islands
 Central banks and currencies of the Caribbean
 Currencies of the British West Indies
 Securities Commission
 List of financial regulatory authorities

References

External links
 Cayman Islands Monetary Authority

Financial regulatory authorities
Cayman Islands
Government agencies of the Cayman Islands
Organizations established in 1997
1997 establishments in the Cayman Islands
Cayman Islands company law

 * bank and insucance supervision
 * Thomson Reuters practical law